Wushu at the 2013 Islamic Solidarity Games is held in Jaka Baring Gymnastic Hall, Palembang, Indonesia from 28 September to 1 October 2013.

Medalists

Men's taolu

Men's sanda

Women's taolu

Medal table

References

Official Results
Results

External links
2013 South Sumatera

2013 Islamic Solidarity Games
2013
2013 in wushu (sport)